Hans Leutenegger (born January 16, 1940 in Bichelsee-Balterswil) is a Swiss bobsledder who competed in the early 1970s. He won the gold medal in the four-man event at the 1972 Winter Olympics in Sapporo.

Leutenegger also founded his own construction firm in Switzerland in 1965, Hans Leutenegger AG, a business that continues . The company has expanded into employment search and a temporary staffing for engineering positions. He also did some acting, working with Klaus Kinski in the 1985 film Kommando Leopard (Commando Leopard).

References
 Bobsleigh four-man Olympic medalists for 1924, 1932-56, and since 1964
 Business website 
 German IMDB profile 
 Hofchilbi information on Leutenegger 

1940 births
Bobsledders at the 1972 Winter Olympics
Living people
Swiss male film actors
Swiss male bobsledders
Swiss businesspeople
Olympic bobsledders of Switzerland
Olympic gold medalists for Switzerland
Olympic medalists in bobsleigh
Medalists at the 1972 Winter Olympics